Taquan Mizzell Sr. (born October 21, 1993) is an American football running back for the BC Lions of the Canadian Football League (CFL). He played college football at the University of Virginia.

Early years
Mizzell attended and played high school football at Bayside High School in Virginia Beach, Virginia.

College career
Mizzell attended University of Virginia, where he played running back. He is the only player in ACC history with 1,500+ career rushing and 1,500+ career receiving yards.

Collegiate statistics

Professional career

Baltimore Ravens
Mizzell signed with the Baltimore Ravens as an undrafted free agent on May 5, 2017. He was waived on September 2, 2017.

Chicago Bears
On September 3, 2017, Mizzell was claimed off waivers by the Chicago Bears.

On September 1, 2018, Mizzell was waived by the Bears and was signed to the practice squad the next day. He was promoted to the active roster on November 3, 2018. In his first game against the Buffalo Bills, Mizzell served as kick returner and also caught a pass for five yards. On Thanksgiving Day, Mizzell scored his first NFL touchdown on a ten-yard reception from Chase Daniel against the Detroit Lions. The following week against the New York Giants, Mizzell rushed three times for seven yards, caught two passes for sixteen yards, and returned two kicks for twenty-four yards. He ended the 2018 season with nine carries for 16 yards and eight receptions for 78 yards and a touchdown.

Before the 2019 season, Mizzell switched to wide receiver from running back; in conjunction with the position move, he changed his number from 33 to 11. He was released during final roster cuts on August 31.

New Orleans Saints
On September 1, 2019, Mizzell was signed to the New Orleans Saints practice squad. He signed a reserve/future contract with the Saints on January 7, 2020. He was waived on August 2, 2020.

New York Giants
On November 17, 2020, Mizzell was signed to the New York Giants' practice squad. He signed a reserve/future contract on January 4, 2021. He was placed on injured reserve on July 23, 2021 with a hamstring injury. He was later released on July 29.

BC Lions
On April 18, 2022, Mizzell signed with the BC Lions of the Canadian Football League.

References

External links
Virginia Cavaliers bio
New Orleans Saints bio
Chicago Bears bio
Baltimore Ravens bio

1993 births
Living people
Players of American football from Virginia
Sportspeople from Virginia Beach, Virginia
American football running backs
American football wide receivers
Virginia Cavaliers football players
Baltimore Ravens players
Chicago Bears players
New Orleans Saints players
New York Giants players